The Kamikaze were suicide attacks by military aviators from the Empire of Japan against Allied naval vessels during World War II.

Kamikaze may also refer to:

Places
 Kamikaze Curve, a sharp curve on New York State Route 17

General 
 Kamikaze (1937 aircraft), a Mitsubishi Ki-15 Karigane aircraft
 Kamikaze (cocktail), a vodka cocktail
 Kamikaze (ride), a pendulum amusement ride
 Kamikaze (typhoon), two typhoons that defeated Mongol invasions of Japan in 1274 and 1281
 Kamikaze, a codename for a 2007 OpenWrt release
 Kamikaze knot, a variant of Sheepshank knot, a shortening knot

Military 
 Kamikaze drone, or loitering munition, a type of weapon system
 Kamikaze-class destroyer, two classes of destroyers of the Imperial Japanese Navy
 Japanese destroyer Kamikaze, two destroyers of the Imperial Japanese Navy
 Japanese salvage ship Kamikaze Maru No. 5, a salvage and repair ship of the Imperial Japanese Navy
 Japanese salvage ship Kamikaze Maru No. 7, a salvage and repair ship of the Imperial Japanese Navy

Art, entertainment, and media

Music

Performers
 Kamikaze (band), an Argentine heavy metal band
 Kamikaz (rapper), French rapper
 Kamikazee, a Filipino rock band
 Matt Robinson (footballer, born 1993), English grime artist under the name Kamakaze

Albums
 Kamikaze (Eminem album) or the title song (see below), 2018
 Kamikaze (Twista album), 2004
 Kamikazee (album), by Kamikazee, 2002

Songs
 "Kamikaze" (Eminem song), 2018
 "Kamikaze" (Lil Mosey song), 2018
 "Kamikaze" (MØ song), 2015
 "Kamikaze" (Walk the Moon song), 2017
 "Born to Lose"/"Kamikaze", by King Adora, 2003
 "Kamikaze", by Amaral from Gato negro dragón rojo, 2008
 "Kamikaze", by Baboon from Sausage, 1992
 "Kamikaze", by The Boys, 1979
 "Kamikaze", by D'espairsRay from Redeemer, 2009
 "Kamikaze", by Five Iron Frenzy from Cheeses...(of Nazareth), 2003
 "Kamikaze", by Flower Travellin' Band from Made in Japan, 1972
 "Kamikaze", by MC Lyte from Act Like You Know, 1991
 "Kamikaze", by Owl City from All Things Bright and Beautiful, 2011
 "Kamikaze", by PJ Harvey from Stories from the City, Stories from the Sea, 2000
 "Kamikaze", by Spock's Beard from X, 2010
 "Kamikaze", by The Thompson Twins from Quick Step & Side Kick, 1983

Other uses in music
 Kamikaze (record label), a Thaipop record label
 ESP Kamikaze, a guitar model distributed by ESP

Other media 
 Kamikaze (comics), a fictional character in the Marvel Comics universe
 Kamikaze (manga), a 1998 manga series by Shiki Satoshi
 Kamikaze (film), a 1986 French science fiction film
 Kamikaze, a 2006 novel by Michael Slade
 Kamikadze – Boski Wiatr, a novel by Bohdan Arct
 Kamikaze, a 2021 HBO Max original program

Sports and games
 Kamakazi (BMX rider) (born 1981), born Jamie Hildebrandt, Australian BMX cyclist
 Kamikaze (soccer formation), a 1-6-3 formation in association football
 Kamikaze (video game) or Astro Invader, a 1979 arcade game
 Kamikaze 1NT, a treatment for an opening notrump bid in contract bridge
 Mammoth Kamikaze, a former U.S. downhill mountain bike race
 Kamikaze Shoichi, Japanese sumo wrestler

See also 
 
 Comikaze, a 2005 EP by Kate Miller-Heidke
 Comikaze Expo, an annual event in Los Angeles, California
 Shinpūren rebellion, an 1876 ex-samurai uprising in Kumamoto, Japan (Shinpū is an alternate reading of the characters for kamikaze)